The 2020–21 EuroLeague Playoffs were played from 20 April 2021 to 5 May 2021. Eight teams competed in the Playoffs. The winners qualified for the 2021 EuroLeague Final Four.

Format
In the playoffs, series are best-of-five, so the first team to win three games wins the series. A 2–2–1 format will be used – the team with home-court advantage will play games 1, 2 and 5 at home while their opponents will host games 3 and 4. Games 4 and 5  will  only be played when necessary.

Qualified teams

Series

|}

Games

Game 1

Game 2

Game 3

Game 4

Game 5

References

External links
Official website

Playoffs
Euroleague Playoffs